This is a list of mayors of Chur. The mayor of Chur held the title of Bürgermeister until 1875. Since then, the Stadtpräsident presides the city's executive, the office of the Bürgermeister is limited to the presidency of the local citizen's corporation (Bürgergemeinde).

References

Chur
Chur
Lists of mayors (complete 1900-2013)